Kayhan Ozcicek-Takagi (born 15 October 1990) is a Japanese-born Australian judoka.

He is the bronze medallist of the 2019 Judo Grand Prix Marrakesh in the −100 kg category.

References

External links
 
 
 

1991 births
Living people
Australian male judoka
Japanese male judoka